Sammanthurai 10 Grama Niladhari Division is a Grama Niladhari Division of the Samanthurai Divisional Secretariat, of Ampara District, of Eastern Province, Sri Lanka.

Demographics

Ethnicity

Religion

References 

Ampara District